Shavy Warren Babicka (born 1 June 2000) is a Gabonese professional footballer who plays as a winger  for Cypriot First Division club Aris Limassol.

Club career

Mangasport
Babicka began his senior career in his native Gabon with Mangasport.

Kiyovu
From 2018 to 2021, he played in Rwanda with Kiyovu.

Aris Limassol
On 5 August 2021, he transferred to the Cypriot club Aris Limassol, together with his compatriot Alex Moucketou-Moussounda. He scored 4 goals and made 6 assists in the 2021-22 season in Cyprus, and was nominated as one of the best attacking players of the season.

International career
Babicka was called up to the Gabon National Team for a set of 2023 Africa Cup of Nations qualification matches in June 2022. He debuted with Gabon in a 1–0 win over DR Congo on 3 June 2022, scoring the game-winning goal.

Career statistics

Club

International

References

External links
 
 FDB Profile

2000 births
Living people
Sportspeople from Libreville
Gabonese footballers
Association football wingers
Aris Limassol FC players
S.C. Kiyovu Sports players
AS Mangasport players
Cypriot First Division players
Rwanda National Football League players
Gabon Championnat National D1 players
Gabonese expatriate footballers
Gabonese expatriates in Cyprus
Expatriate footballers in Cyprus
Gabonese expatriates in Rwanda
Expatriate footballers in Rwanda